"The Devil in Iron" is one of the original stories by Robert E. Howard about Conan the Cimmerian, first published in Weird Tales in August 1934. Howard earned $115 for the publication of this story. 

The plot concerns the resurrection of a mythical demon, the theft of a sacred dagger, and an unrelated trap that lures Conan to the island fortress roamed by the demon. The story's plot loopholes and borrowed elements from "Iron Shadows in the Moon" lead some Howard scholars to call this story the weakest of the early Conan tales.

Plot summary
The actions of a greedy fisherman awaken an ancient demon, Khosatral Khel, on the remote island of Xapur. Khel resurrects his fortress which once dominated the island, including its cyclopean walls, gigantic pythons, and undead citizens.

Meanwhile, an evil governor from Turan, Jehungir Agha, tricks Conan into pursuing Princess Octavia to the island of Xapur. Jehungir Agha plans for Conan to fall into a prepared trap on the island. The unforeseen resurrection of Khel and his ancient fortress interrupts Agha's original plan.

When Conan arrives on Xapur, he battles not only the mercenaries employed by Jehungir Agha, but also a giant serpent and the iron-fleshed Khosatral Khel.

Publication history
Weird Tales first published The Devil in Iron in the August 1934 issue. The story was republished in the collections Conan the Barbarian (Gnome Press, 1954) and Conan the Wanderer (Lancer Books, 1968). It has more recently been published in the collections The Conan Chronicles Volume 1: The People of the Black Circle (Gollancz, 2000) and Conan of Cimmeria: Volume One (1932-1933) (Del Rey, 2003).

Adaptation
Roy Thomas, John Buscema and Alfredo Alcala adapted this story in Savage Sword of Conan #15.

References

External links

 
 The Devil in Iron at Project Gutenberg Australia
 
 Conan the Barbarian at AmratheLion.com
 Conan.com: The official website
 

1934 short stories
Conan the Barbarian stories by Robert E. Howard
Demons in written fiction
Fantasy short stories
Horror short stories
Pulp stories
Works originally published in Weird Tales
Works set on fictional islands